This article refers to crime in the U.S. state of Minnesota.

Statistics
In 2008 there were 162,527 crimes reported in Minnesota, including 109 murders. In 2015, one of the largest problems was aggravated assault, with 7,094 crimes reported in the state.

Capital punishment laws
Capital punishment is not applied in this state.

See also
 Organized crime in Minneapolis

References